Beýik Türkmenbaşy District was a district of Lebap Province in Turkmenistan. It was abolished in November 2017 and its territory transferred to Döwletli District.

References

Lebap Region